Ralph Tewe was the member of Parliament for Coventry in 1302. He was a merchant. He was MP for Leicester (UK Parliament constituency) in 1301.

References 

Members of the Parliament of England for Coventry
English MPs 1302
13th-century births
14th-century deaths
14th-century English people
English merchants